Arkie Deya Whiteley (6 November 1964 – 19 December 2001) was an Australian actress who appeared in television and film.

Early life and education 
Whiteley's parents were the renowned Australian artist Brett Whiteley and cultural figure Wendy Whiteley. According to her obituary in The Times newspaper, when living with her parents at the Hotel Chelsea in New York as an infant her babysitter was US blues singer Janis Joplin. Arkie was educated at the prestigious Ascham School in Sydney and an alternative school: the Australian International School at North Ryde, Sydney. She also attended Cremorne Girls High.

Career 
Her television and film work included A Town Like Alice, Razorback, Mad Max 2, Gallowglass, Princess Caraboo and The Last Musketeer with Robson Green. She also appeared in the television series Prisoner as troubled prostitute/junkie Donna Mason and in early episodes of A Country Practice.

After her father's overdose in 1992, she negotiated with the New South Wales government to purchase his studio and run it as a studio museum managed by the Art Gallery of New South Wales.

Personal life 
Whiteley married her first husband Christopher Kuhn in 1995; they divorced in 1999. She married her second husband Jim Elliott in December 2001, shortly before she died from adrenal cancer on December 19, at age 37. She had a seven-year relationship with actor Paul Rhys who nursed her during her illness.

She was cremated at Sydney's Northern Suburbs Crematorium. Both Arkie's and her father Brett's ashes are buried in an undisclosed location in Wendy's secret garden in the Sydney North Shore suburb of Lavender Bay.

Filmography

References

External links 
 
Child of Fame (Sydney Morning Herald, Saturday 22 December 2001)

1964 births
2001 deaths
Australian film actresses
Australian soap opera actresses
Australian people of English descent
Deaths from cancer in New South Wales
Deaths from adrenocortical cancer
People educated at Ascham School
20th-century Australian actresses
21st-century Australian actresses
Julius family